The River Strule is a small river in County Tyrone, Northern Ireland. The river has its source in the confluence of the rivers Camowen and Drumragh at Omagh. The Strule runs to north and meets the rivers Fairy Water and Owenkillew before joining the River Derg and forming the River Mourne.

References

Rivers of Northern Ireland